Edouard Suenson was a Danish vice admiral who was known for his participation in the First Schleswig War and Second Schleswig War where he was the main Danish commander at the Battle of Heligoland.

Biography

Family
Edouard Suenson was the son of Captain Jean Isaac Suenson (1774–1821) and his wife Anna Susanne, née Lütken (1778–1872). He married Ottilia Uldall (February 10, 1816 - March 22, 1872) in Copenhagen on September 11, 1837, the daughter of the captain, later commander and chamberlain, Johan Joachim Uldall (1777–1839) and his wife Anna Christiane Nellemann (1781– 1833).

He had a son of the same name Edouard Suenson (1842-1921), who was a naval officer and director of the Great Nordic Telegraph Company.

Military career
He entered military service in 1817 as a cadet and promoted to Lieutenant on September 14, 1823. Around 1825/26, he sailed for the Danish West Indies on the corvette Diana and was granted admission to serve in the French Royal Navy. He was aboard the brig Alcyone near Navarino and the combined British-French-Russian fleet would completely destroy the Ottoman navy at the Battle of Navarino. He later served on board the frigate Thetis during the Invasion of Algiers in 1830 from 1830 to 1831 under Admiral Guy-Victor Duperré. In the autumn of 1831 he returned home from the French service and in 1831/32 sailed with the brig St. Jan to the Danish West Indies. On May 29, he was promoted to First Lieutenant at Sea. In 1840 he was given command of the steamship Kiel and later was promoted on February 13, 1841, to Lieutenant Commander. In the years 184041 he sailed with the frigate Bellona to the east and west coast of South America. From 1842 to 1844, he was in command of the steamship ÆgirIn 1846 he sailed as a commander with the brig St. Croix to Iceland and in 1847 became commander of the Trekroner Fort off Copenhagen.

First Schleswig War
In 1848, the First Schleswig War broke out and Suenson was Commander of the schooner Pilen, a guard ship near Nyborg in the Great Belt. In 1849, he became commander of the corvette Diana, a guard ship near Helsingør. In 1850, he was Commander of the steamship Hekla in the Baltic Sea Squadron. In the bay of Neustadt there was a battle with the Schleswig-Holstein steam cannon boat Von der Tann on July 20 and 21, 1850, during which the Von der Tann ran aground and was abandoned by its crew and set on fire. The ship was later repaired and incorporated into the Danish fleet under the name Støren.

On August 16, 1850, Edouard Suenson led a battle between the Danish ships Hekla and Løwe with four Schleswig-Holstein gunboats in the Bay of Kiel.

Interwar Period
After the war, he became a member of the Construction and Regulatory Commission in 1851. In May, he was commander of the Naval Cadet Corps. He held this position until 1863 and was also in command of the cadet ships and corvettes Flora in 1851, Valkyrien in 1853, 1855 and 1857, Heimdal in 1860 and the frigate Jylland in 1862.

Throughout his service in this period, he was promoted to Corvette Captain on February 26, 1850. On September 24, 1855, to frigate captain and finally on March 24, 1858, to sea captain but on February 26, 1850, he was a frigate captain again.

Second Schleswig War

Edouard Suenson had been in command of the Danish squadron in the North Sea with the frigates Niels Juel and Jylland and the corvettes Dagmar and Heimdal since the spring of 1864 . Their task was to arrest German merchant ships in the English Channel and the North Sea and thus ensure a sea blockade in Germany. The penetration of the Austrian squadron, allied with Prussia, under the command of Wilhelm von Tegetthoff into Danish waters should also be prevented. On May 9, 1864, the Battle of Heligoland began as the Danish fought the Austrian squadron. The battle ended in a draw, but later both sides claimed victory for themselves.

Accolade and commemoration

On May 15, 1864, Suenson received the Grand Cross of the Order of the Dannebrog. He is buried in Holmens Cemetery in Copenhagen.

The Edouard Suenson Memorial at Nyboder in Copenhagen was inaugurated in 1886. It incorporates a bust of him by Theobald Stein from 1866. The nearby street Suensonsgade is also named after him.

A number of ships of the Royal Danish Navy have also been named after Suenson.

An 1881 oil on vanvas portrait painting of him by Otto Bache is on display in the Museum of National History at Frederiksborg Castle in Hillerød. He is also seen in paintings by Christian Mølsted (1897–98, Frederiksborg Castle), H. Nik. Hansen (1910), Erik Henningsen (1915, Christiansborg) and August Jerndorff.

References

Bibliography
 Th. A. Topsøe-Jensen: Det Danske Søofficerskorps 1801–1919. Gyldendals Boghandel and Nordisk Forlag, Copenhagen 1919.
 Th. A. Topsøe-Jensen, Emil Marquard: Officerer i den Dansk-Norske Søetat 1660–1814 og den Danske Søetat 1814–1932. Band I und II, H. Hagerups Forlag, Copenhagen 1935.
 H. Degenkolv: Oplysninger vedrørende den danske flaades skibe i sidste aarhundrede. Copenhagen 1906.
 Th. Topsøe-Jensen: Edouard Suenson (1805–1887). In: Dansk Biografisk Leksikon. 3. Auflage. Gyldendal (dänisch, denstoredanske.dk).

1805 births
1887 deaths
19th-century Danish naval officers
Royal Danish Navy admirals
People of the First Schleswig War
Danish military personnel of the Second Schleswig War
Grand Crosses of the Order of the Dannebrog
French Navy officers
French people of the Greek War of Independence